Sheeba Hassan (née Arshad) is a Pakistani stage and television actress who is known for her comic role as Chandi in the TV serial Sona Chandi (1982).

Early life
Sheeba was born into a lower middle-class family of musicians in Lahore, Pakistan. Both of her aunts Mukhtar Begum and Farida Khanum were well known ghazal singers of their times. She learned classical dance from Maharaj Ghulam Hussain Kathak. She made her debut as a child artist at Radio Pakistan Lahore in the 1960s and her first radio play was Mehtab Din Di Baithak (Gathering With Mehtab Din).

Career
In the 1970s she started her career as a stage artist at the Alhamra Hall, Lahore. She did many theatre and stage plays including the play Twist but it was a comedy role in Lada Pithi (Spoilt Girl) that made her well-known in the world of theater. Sheeba worked in hundreds of stage plays most typically Hakkay Bakkay. Because of her sharp wit Punjabi-language acting, she was known as Mahi Munda (Tomboy of The Punjabi Stage).

She earned fame by starring as Chandi in Munnu Bhai's TV serial Sona Chandi, which was aired in 1982 on PTV. She was paired with actor Hamid Rana who acted as Sona in the play. Later, she again appeared in Munnu Bhai's another play Ababeel. She also continued participating in stage dramas until she announced retirement in 2014.

Personal life
Sheeba got married in the late 1980s and has four children.

Filmography

Television series
 Sona Chandi as Chandi
 Damad
 Jokar Pokar
 Ahsas Aur Kamtari
 Dareechay
 Dastaan-e-Habib
 Keh Jaaan Mein Koon as Nazeera
 Ababeel as Nagina

Other appearance

Awards and nominations

References

External links
 

1960 births
20th-century Pakistani actresses
Living people
Pakistani television actresses
Pakistani stage actresses
Radio personalities from Lahore
Pakistani radio personalities
PTV Award winners
21st-century Pakistani actresses